Antalas (c. 500 – after 548) was a Berber tribal leader who played a major role in the wars of the Byzantine Empire against the Berber tribes in Africa. Antalas and his tribe, the Frexes initially served the Byzantines as allies, but after 544 switched sides. With the final Byzantine victory in his and his tribe once again became Byzantine subjects. The main sources on his life are the epic poem Iohannis of Flavius Cresconius Corippus and the Histories of the Wars of Procopius of Caesarea.

Life
Antalas was born c. 500, and was the son of a certain Guenfan, according to Corippus. He belonged to Frexes tribe of Byzacena (modern central Tunisia). Corippus reports that Antalas career began at the age of seventeen, stealing sheep. He soon followers around him and became a brigand, fighting against the Vandals. By 530, he had become leader of the Berbers in Byzacena, and in the same year led them to a decisive victory against the Vandals.

Following the Vandalic War (533–534) and the capture of the Vandalic Kingdom by the Byzantine Empire, Antalas became an ally of the empire, receiving subsidies and supplies in exchange. In 543, however, a revolt broke out among the Berbers of Byzacena, which resulted in the execution of his brother Guarizila and the cessation of the subsidies by the Byzantine governor, Solomon. This treatment alienated Antalas, and when the Leuathae rebelled in Tripolitania in the next year, he and his followers joined them. The united tribes inflicted a heavy defeat on the Byzantines in the Battle of Cillium, where Solomon himself was killed.

With the death of the capable Solomon, his nephew Sergius, whose arrogant treatment of the Leuathae had prompted their rebellion in the first place, was appointed governor in Africa. Stotzas, a renegade Byzantine soldier who had led an unsuccessful rebellion a few years earlier, now joined Antalas from his refuge in Mauretania. Antalas wrote to the Byzantine emperor, Justinian I, asking for Sergius' dismissal, but in vain. Justinian only dispatched the patrician Areobindus in early 545 to share command with Sergius, but both were militarily incompetent and spent their time bickering with each other. While Sergius remained inactive at Carthage, Antalas and Stotzas led their troops north and managed to trick Himerius, the commander of Hadrumetum, into leaving the town with his troops and rendezvous with another Byzantine commander, John. Himerius fell into the trap, and while his soldiers mutinied and joined Stotzas, he was forced to betray Hadrumetum to save his life. Finally, in late 545 Areobindus ordered the reluctant John to advance and meet the joint army of Antalas and Stotzas, which was encamped at Sicca Veneria. John's troops were considerably outnumbered by the rebel forces, and in the Battle of Thacia his army was routed and he himself was killed, but not before mortally wounding Stotzas in a duel.

After the defeat at Thacia, Sergius was relieved and Areobindus replaced him. At this time, the ambitious Byzantine dux of Numidia, Guntharic contacted the various Berber leaders in a bid to unseat Areobindus. Antalas was promised the rule of Byzacena, half the treasure of Areobindus and 1,500 Byzantine troops as his command. In order to increase pressure on Areobindus, the Berbers and the renegade followers of Stotzas approached Carthage. At the same time, Areobindus himself had secret contacts with another Berber leader, Cutzinas, leader of the Numidian Berbers. Cutzinas had promised to murder Antalas once battle was joined, but Guntharic revealed this plan to Antalas. In the event, due to Areobindus' timidity, a battle did not take place; in March Guntharic seized Carthage and murdered Areobindus.

Now master of Carthage, Guntharic refused to honour his agreement with Antalas, and the latter withdrew his men into Byzacena. There, in an effort to reconcile himself with the emperor, he contacted the dux of Byzacena, Marcentius, who had fled to an offshore island, proposing to make common cause against Guntharic. Guntharic sent an army under Cutzinas and Artabanes against Antalas and defeated him. Guntharic himself was murdered soon after (May 546) by a conspiracy headed by Artabanes, and Carthage and the army returned to the Empire's allegiance. Justinian now sent an experienced soldier, John Troglita, to impose order on the troubled African provinces. Gathering his forces, Troglita marched out of Carthage into Byzacena. Antalas sent an embassy to the Byzantine general, but the latter rejected his demands and imprisoned the envoys. Shortly after, he sent an emissary of his own, who placed Antalas before the choice of battle or immediate submission. Antalas refused to submit, and the two armies confronted each other near Sbeitla in Byzacena in late 546 or early 547. The battle resulted in a crushing Byzantine victory: the Berbers suffered heavy losses, and the battle-standards lost at Cillium were recovered by the Byzantines.

In the summer, however, Antalas joined the Berbers of Tripolitania (though he is not mentioned by Corippus, Procopius records his presence) and inflicted a heavy defeat on Troglita at the Battle of Marta. After their victory, the Berbers raided even to the outskirts of Carthage. In the next year, Antalas again joined the Tripolitanian Berbers, under their leader Carcasan, when they invaded Byzacena. In contrast to the impetuous Carcasan, Antalas advocated a more cautious scorched earth tactic when Troglita marched forth to meet them. Nevertheless, when the two adversaries met later in the summer in the Battle of the Fields of Cato, the result was a decisive Byzantine victory: Carcasan fell, and the Berber revolt was crushed as Antalas and the surviving leaders submitted to Troglita. Nothing further is known of him after that.

References

Sources
 
 
 

6th-century rulers in Africa
Berber rulers
Byzacena
Byzantine North Africa
Byzantine rebels
6th-century Berber people
Berber rebels